Anna Sergeevna Antonova Weber (born 18 September 1965) is a former competitive figure skater who represented the Soviet Union. She is the 1981 World Junior bronze medalist and a three-time Soviet national medalist. She finished in the top ten at the 1982 and 1983 European Championships. Her coach was Alexei Mishin.

As of 2017, Antonova Weber coaches skating in Évry, Essonne, France.

Results

References

External links 
 skatabase

Soviet female single skaters
1965 births
Living people
World Junior Figure Skating Championships medalists
Sportspeople from Kharkiv